Cinquera is a municipality in the Cabañas department of El Salvador.

Local Attractions 

 Hostal de Cinquera (translation: Hostel of Cinquera)
 Memorial de el conflicto armado Park  (translation: memorial of the armed conflict park)
 las flores Park  (translation: the flowers park)
 Iglesia Catolica de Cinquera (translation: Catholic Church of Cinquera)

Cinquera Ecological Park 
Walk through the peaceful woods of Cinquera Ecological Park, a former base for guerrilla bands during the civil war and now a serene conservation region.

The area around the small town of Cinquera, 18km from Suchitoto in northern El Salvador was afflicted by heavy fighting during the civil war, many of the inhabitants left the area and the guerrillas moved in. Their bases came under attack from the army and they took shelter within the forests landscapes. After the war, the returning population started to clear the woodland for agriculture, much to the chagrin of former rebels who respected the environment for having offered them shelter.

An ecological reserve was established to conserve what remained of the native vegetation. It also maintains various vestiges of the war such as the rebel hospital and kitchen.  You can walk around the reserve with a local guide: most guides are former guerrillas and can relate many poignant tales from the wartime period.  You’ll also appreciate the beauty and serenity of the countryside at peace.

References

Municipalities of the Cabañas Department